is a former Japanese football player.

Playing career
Takahashi was born in Chiba Prefecture on May 6, 1983. After graduating from high school, he joined J1 League club Tokyo Verdy in 2002. On November 17, he debuted as substitute midfielder rom the 57th minutes against Kashiwa Reysol. However he could not play at all in the match in 2003 and retired end of 2003 season.

Club statistics

References

External links

1983 births
Living people
Association football people from Chiba Prefecture
Japanese footballers
J1 League players
Tokyo Verdy players
Association football midfielders